Ibrahim Bin Khalil is a Bangladeshi Jatiya Party politician and the former Member of Parliament of Chittagong-14.

Career
Khalil was elected to parliament from Chittagong-14 as a Bangladesh Awami League candidate in 1986 and 1988. He was a member of the Chittagong Division Sub-Committee.

References

Awami League politicians
Living people
3rd Jatiya Sangsad members
4th Jatiya Sangsad members
Year of birth missing (living people)
People from Satkania Upazila